Lex lata (also called de lege lata) is a Latin expression used in matters of international law. Its most common translation is "the law as it exists," but it is sometimes seen as "the law that has been borne," or "ratified law."

When used in legal proceedings, lex lata refers to the law that is presently enforced. This rules out any previous laws or laws that have not been passed, and prevents the use of hypothetical arguments from any interpreters of the term.

Lex lata can be compared to lus conditum ("established law"), and its opposite is lex ferenda, which translates to "future law" or "what the law ought to be."

Literal Translation 
"Lēx" is Latin for "law, and "lata" is derived from the word "lātus," which means "broad" or "wide."

History of Latin Legal Terms 
The English language was first used by Germanic tribes who traveled to England around the 5th century A.D.. The language they spoke and introduced to native Britons is referred to as Old English. As more natives came into contact with the Germanic tribes, a common culture developed that we came to call Anglo-Saxon. Though Old English was the Anglo-Saxons' primary language, Latin–which was established during Rome's occupation of Britain–was also used as "the language of law," and later, the language of religion and schooling. Legal language benefitted greatly from the rise of written communication, and Latin was well-suited setting the bar for written communication.

References

See also
List of Latin phrases

Latin legal terminology